Albina Nikolaevna Deriugina (Ukrainian: Альбі́на Микола́ївна Дерю́гіна, born 16 March 1932, Makiivka) is a Soviet and Ukrainian rhythmic gymnastics coach. She trained her daughter Irina Deriugina to Olympic success and the two then became a very successful coaching team. She was made a Hero of Ukraine in 2002.

Career 
Albina Deriugina was born . She married Ivan Deriuhin (an Olympic gold medallist in modern pentathlon) and they brought up a daughter, Irina Deriugina. Albina became the Soviet rhythmic gymnastics coach and coached Iryna to all-round gold medals at both the 1977 World Rhythmic Gymnastics Championships and 1979 World Rhythmic Gymnastics Championships.

After Iryna stepped down from competition at the age of 24, mother and daughter combined as a highly successful coaching team, creating a private school and training athletes who won a total of 120 gold medals. The Deriuginas have coached among others Hanna Rizatdinova.

Accolades  
Albina Deriugina is regarded as a legendary figure in gymnastics. In 1995, Irina Deriugina established the Deriugina Cup, an international gymnastics competition in Kyiv, in tribute to her mother.

She has been made a Hero of Ukraine, the highest civilian award in the Ukraine, in 2002. In 2015, the National Olympic Committee of Ukraine celebrated its 25th anniversary and presented Deriugina with its highest award, the NOC medal.

References 

1932 births
Living people
Sportspeople from Makiivka
National University of Ukraine on Physical Education and Sport alumni
Merited Coaches of the Soviet Union
Recipients of the Order of Merit (Ukraine), 2nd class
Recipients of the Order of Princess Olga, 3rd class
Recipients of the Order of the Red Banner of Labour
Recipients of the Order of State
Soviet gymnastics coaches
Ukrainian gymnastics coaches